Death of Me is a 2020 American horror film, directed by Darren Lynn Bousman, from a screenplay by Arli Margolis, James Morley III and David Tish. It stars Maggie Q, Alex Essoe, and Luke Hemsworth. 

It was released on October 2, 2020, by Saban Films.

Premise

An American couple vacationing on a remote island in Thailand must uncover why they have woken up with no recollection of recent events. The first major piece of the puzzle they find is a strange and disturbing video of the previous night that shows one of them killing the other.

Cast
 Maggie Q as Christine
 Luke Hemsworth as Neil
 Alex Essoe as Samantha
 Kat Ingkarat as Madee
 Kelly B. Jones as Kanda

Production
In July 2018, it was announced Maggie Q and Luke Hemsworth had been set to star in the film, with Darren Lynn Bousman directing from a screenplay by Arli Margolis, James Morley III and David Tish. In August 2018, Alex Essoe also joined the cast.

Release
In August 2019, Saban Films acquired distribution rights to the film. It was released on October 2, 2020.

Reception
The website's consensus reads, "Despite a handful of decent jolts and Maggie Q's committed performance, Death of Mes intriguing premise is undone by its listless and largely scare-free execution." On Metacritic, the film has a weighted average score of 31 out of 100, based on four critics, indicating "generally unfavorable reviews."

References

External links
 
 
 

2020 films
2020 horror films
American horror films
Films about couples
Films about security and surveillance
Films about vacationing
Films shot in Thailand
Saban Films films
Films directed by Darren Lynn Bousman
Films set in Thailand
Uxoricide in fiction
Films impacted by the COVID-19 pandemic
2020s English-language films
2020s American films